Halosphaeriopsis is a fungal genus in the family Halosphaeriaceae. This is a monotypic genus, containing the single species Halosphaeriopsis mediosetigera.

References

Microascales
Monotypic Sordariomycetes genera